Club Presidente Hayes is a Paraguayan football (soccer) club from Tacumbú, a section of Asunción, Paraguay. The club is also known colloquially by its nicknames The Yankees (Los Yanquis) and The Little Star (La Estrellita). They play regularly in Asuncion's Kiko Reyes Stadium (Estadio Kiko Reyes) as part of the Paraguayan Soccer League (Asociacion Paraguaya de Futbol). The club was founded in 1907 and participated in their first international tournament in the 1953 Copa Montevideo. It is one of several entities in Paraguay that were named in honor of Rutherford B. Hayes, the 19th President of the United States of America. Hayes, who was required to arbitrate an Argentine-Paraguayan territorial dispute in the Gran Chaco after the War of the Triple Alliance,  decided in favour of Paraguay. The club is the former home of Paraguayans Néstor Benítez, Teófilo Barrios, Tomás Guzmán, Julio Valentín González and José Ariel Núñez, and foreigners Riki Kitawaki, Bryan Lopez, and Victor Cristaldo

History
In 1945, the club obtains its best result by finishing third in the 1945 Paraguayan Primera División season.

In 1952, the club wins the 1952 Paraguayan Primera División season.

Current squad
As of March 2021.

Notable players
To appear in this section a player must have either:
 Played at least 125 games for the club.
 Set a club record or won an individual award while at the club.
 Been part of a national team at any time.
 Played in the first division of any other football association (outside of Paraguay).
 Played in a continental and/or intercontinental competition.

1930s
 Eustacio Chamorro
1950s
 Néstor Benítez (1957–1962)
1990s
  Edgar Denis (1991–1993)
 Justo Jacquet (1994–1995)
 Paulo da Silva (1996)
 Teófilo Barrios (1997)
 Tomás Guzmán (1998–2000)
 Jorge Brítez (1999)
2000s
 Inocencio Zárate (2002–presente)
 Julio Valentín González (2008)
 José Ariel Núñez (2008)
2010s
 Freddy Cabezas (2018)

Non-CONMEBOL players
 Victor Cristaldo (1993–1996)
 Riki Kitawaki (2007)
 Bryan Lopez (2013)

Club honours

League
Paraguayan Primera División: 1
1952

Paraguayan División Intermedia: 8
1911, 1919, 1958, 1967, 1971, 1973, 1974, 1991

Paraguayan Tercera División: 1
2006

References

External links

Soccerway.com Profile
Presidente Hayes Info
Paraguayan Soccer Info

Presidente Hayes
Presidente Hayes
Association football clubs established in 1907
Presidente Hayes Department
1907 establishments in Paraguay